The  Agrega project  (Agrega is the Spanish word for "add") is a federation of learning Digital repository which is to be used by 19 educational authorities in Spain. Each educational authority will have its own repository loaded with curricular learning objects created according to standards, and each single repository will be able to integrate and interoperate with other learning systems locally and worldwide.

Objectives
The project objectives are to:
 Promote, unify and establish a common cataloguing, packaging and publishing standard of Spanish education community learning objects
 Create a technological reference framework where learning objects can be ubiquitous accessed under different models of utilization
 Generate a common procedure and establish the best practices to create digital learning objects from standards

History
In order to create a sustainable learning federation the following principles have been followed as:
 Generate a federation of interoperable Spanish educational repositories instead of a single central repository
 Promote openness to repository interoperability using whenever it is possible well-known standards. Agrega is based in digital repositories standards like IMS DRI, SQI, RSS and OAI-PMH and digital objects standards as SCORM for object packaging and IMS SS for object sequencing and LOM-ES Spanish profile for metadata (which is based on Learning object metadata).
 Use whenever is possible, standards and open source tools with a dynamic and active and steadily growing community. Agrega is being developed with well-known open source tools.
 Develop a service-oriented architecture (SOA) and promote a technical architectural style whose goal is to achieve loose coupling among heterogeneous interacting software agents.

The Agrega project has a clear focus on integration and interoperability between Agrega learning repositories and the rest of the world. Moreover, it is open to collaborative evolution based on a generic GPL licensing. It is the first step towards providing a nationwide access to content generated by the education community in a consistent and interoperable way.

Curricular content for Agrega is being developed under Creative Commons licensing schemes, can be experimented directly from a web site, offline or by an LMS, and all the contents and application will be localised in Spanish, Basque, Catalan, Valencian, Galician and English.

With this system, teachers and students will be able to search a vast repository of certified curricular content. access all the learning objects in the repository from a  standard browser, and Share content with other teachers and students. Teachers and the education community will be able to create new content in a consistent way, compose, package, reuse already existing content, quickly publish  certified curricular content.

Partners
Agrega project partners are: Red.es (public entrepreneurial entity attached to the Ministry of Industry), the Ministry of Industry, the Ministry of Education and the Spanish Autonomous Communities of Spain.

References
SPEDECE2007
SPEDECE2008
DLIB Magazine

External links
 Official web site
 Slideshare Agrega
 Video de Agrega
 Agrega y Ariadne

Aggregation-based digital libraries
Spanish digital libraries